Nate Holley (born December 5, 1994) is an American football safety for the Birmingham Stallions of the United States Football League (USFL). Holley played high school football at Whitmer High School in Toledo, Ohio. He played NCAA football at Kent State. He has also been a member of the Minnesota Vikings, Nebraska Danger, Los Angeles Rams, and Calgary Stampeders.

College career
Holley played four seasons at Kent State, appearing in 43 games for the Golden Flashes, contributing with 424 tackles, three sacks and one interception. He finished his collegiate career in the top 10 on the Golden Flashes’ all-time tackles list. During his senior season, he led the nation with an average of 8.9 solo tackles per game. For his career, he had 426 total tackles including 15 tackles for loss, three sacks, one interception, two forced fumbles and seven pass breakups. He was named first-team all-Mid-American Conference in 2014 and 2015.

Professional career

Early career
After going undrafted in the 2017 NFL Draft Holley signed with the Minnesota Vikings, but was later released. He signed with the Indoor Football League’s Nebraska Danger on May 22, 2018; Holley played in only 2 games with Nebraska, but still put up an impressive 23 tackles and a forced fumble. Holley next signed with the Los Angeles Rams on June 8, 2018, but was waived at the conclusion of training camp.

Calgary Stampeders
Holley signed with the Calgary Stampeders of the Canadian Football League (CFL) on May 19, 2019. Holley had a very productive first season in the league, playing in all 18 regular season games and contributing with 78 defensive tackles, 22 special teams tackles, one sack and one interception. Following the season he was named the league's Most Outstanding Rookie. On February 14, 2020, the CFLPA filed a grievance against the CFL on behalf of Holley. Holley sought to be released from his contract so he could pursue NFL opportunities, as was the agreement when he signed his two-year contract the year prior. In late April, after the NFL window had closed, the CFLPA announced that they were taking Holley's case to arbitration. The CFL cancelled their 2020 season on August 17, and Holley was released from his contract two days later.

Miami Dolphins
Holley had a tryout with the Miami Dolphins on August 21, 2020. He signed with the team the next day. He was waived on September 5, 2020, and signed to the practice squad the next day. He was elevated to the active roster on December 5 and December 9 for the team's weeks 13 and 14 games against the Cincinnati Bengals and Kansas City Chiefs, and reverted to the practice squad after each game. He was promoted to the active roster on January 2, 2021.

On August 31, 2021, Holley was waived by the Dolphins.

Toronto Argonauts
On November 3, 2021, it was announced that Holley had signed with the Toronto Argonauts. However, on November 17, 2021, the league announced that they would not register his contract due to a violation with their Violence Against Women Policy.

Birmingham Stallions
On March 10, 2022, Holley was drafted by the Birmingham Stallions of the United States Football League. He was placed on injured reserve on May 19, 2022, with a lower leg injury.

Personal life
Holley has a twin named Nick, who is a running back. They played college football together at Kent State and were on the Los Angeles Rams and Nebraska Danger together.

In early November 2016 Holley was charged with felony kidnapping and assault. He was immediately suspended by the NCAA and released by the Kent State Golden Flashes football program. In February 2017, three months after being charged, Holley was found not guilty.

References

External links
 Kent State bio

1994 births
Living people
American players of Canadian football
Canadian football linebackers
Canadian Football League Rookie of the Year Award winners
Kent State Golden Flashes football players
Nebraska Danger players
Players of American football from Ohio
Sportspeople from Toledo, Ohio
Los Angeles Rams players
Calgary Stampeders players
Miami Dolphins players
American football linebackers
Birmingham Stallions (2022) players